The Lord's Prayer has been translated and updated throughout the history of the English language. Here are examples which show the major developments:

Translations of Matthew 6:9b–13 
The text of the Matthean Lord's Prayer in the King James Version (KJV) of the Bible ultimately derives from first Old English translations. Not considering the doxology, only five words of the KJV are later borrowings directly from the Latin Vulgate (these being debts, debtors, temptation, deliver, and amen). Early English translations such as the Wycliffe and the Old English, however, were themselves translations of the Latin Vulgate.

AD 995, Old English

-
-

AD 1389 Wycliffe

-
-
Amen.

AD 1526 Tyndale

Amen.

AD 1611 King James Version

Amen.

Other liturgical sources 

AD 1549 Anglican BCP

-
-
Amen.

AD 1662 Anglican BCP

Our Father, which art in heaven,
Hallowed be thy Name.
Thy kingdom come.
Thy will be done,
in earth as it is in heaven.
Give us this day our daily bread.
And forgive us our trespasses,
As we forgive them that trespass against us.
And lead us not into temptation;
But deliver us from evil:
[For thine is the kingdom, the power,
and the glory, for ever and ever.]
Amen.

1759 Ordo administrandi sacramenta

Our Father who art in heaven,
hallowed be thy name.
Thy kingdom come.
Thy will be done
on earth as it is in heaven.
Give us this day our daily bread,
and forgive us our trespasses,
as we forgive them that trespass against us,
and lead us not into temptation,
but deliver us from evil.
-
-
Amen.

AD 1772 Anglican BCP

Our Father, which art in heaven;
Hallowed by thy Name.
Thy kingdom come.
Thy will be done in earth,
As it is in heaven.
Give us this day our daily bread.
And forgive us our trespasses,
As we forgive them that trespass against us.
And lead us not into temptation;
But deliver us from evil:
[For thine is the kingdom, :and the power,
and the glory, for ever and ever.]
Amen.

Baltimore Catechism 1885

-
-
Amen.

The 1892 U.S. BCP

[For thine is the kingdom, and the power,
and the glory, for ever and ever.]
Amen.

AD 1928 Anglican BCP

Our Father, who art in heaven,
Hallowed be thy Name.
Thy kingdom come.
Thy will be done,
On earth as it is in heaven.
Give us this day our daily bread.
And forgive us our trespasses,
As we forgive those who trespass against us.
And lead us not into temptation,
But deliver us from evil.
For thine is the kingdom, and the power,
and the glory, for ever and ever.
Amen.

AD 1988 ELLC

Our Father in heaven,
hallowed be your name,
your kingdom come,
your will be done,
on earth as in heaven.
Give us today our daily bread.
Forgive us our sins
as we forgive those who sin against us.
Save us from the time of trial
and deliver us from evil.
[For the kingdom, the power,
and the glory are yours now and for ever.]
Amen.

Other versions
1768 Benjamin Franklin

Heavenly Father,
May all revere thee,
And become thy dutiful Children and faithful Subjects.
May thy Laws be obeyed on Earth as perfectly as they are in Heaven.
Provide for us this Day as thou has hitherto daily done.
Forgive us our Trespasses, and enable us likewise to forgive those that offend us.
Keep us out of Temptation, and deliver us from Evil.

References 

Lord's Prayer
History of the English language